Godsgrave is a 2017 adult dark fantasy novel by Jay Kristoff. It is the second installment in the Nevernight Chronicle, after Nevernight (2016).

Synopsis 
Assassin Mia Corvere continues her quest to avenge her family, while mastering her Darkin abilities to control shadows. She begins training as a gladiator in the arenas as a way to grow closer to her next target.

Reception 
The book received mostly positive reviews from critics for its swift pacing, dark humor and bloody violence. The book won the 2017 Aurealis Award for Best Fantasy Novel.

References 

2017 fantasy novels
2017 Australian novels
Australian fantasy novels
Thomas Dunne Books books
Novels by Jay Kristoff